Keikavus was the ruler of the Ziyarid dynasty from ca. 1050 to 1087. He was the son of Iskandar and grandson of Qabus. During his reign, he had little power, due to his status as a vassal to the Seljuqs. He is the celebrated author of the Qabus nama, a major work of Persian literature.

Biography 
Keikavus was born in 1021, during the reign of his uncle Manuchihr. In 1041/1042, the Seljuq Sultan Tughril conquered Tabaristan. He then appointed a Seljuq noble to govern the region, but let Anushirvan Sharaf al-Ma'ali keep his status as nominal ruler of those territories. During this period, Keikavus spent his time traveling around the Middle East; he stayed for eight years at Ghazni and even married a daughter of the Ghaznavid Sultan Mahmud, who later bore him Gilanshah. Keikavus then took performed a pilgrimage to Mecca, where he afterwards traveled to the court of the Shaddadid emir Abu'l-Aswar Shavur at Ganja in Arran, and aided him in his invasion of Ani. In 1050, Anushirvan died, and was succeeded by Keikavus as the ruler of Tabaristan. Keikavus' long and peaceful reign certainly encouraged his domains to more cultural activities. Keikavus later died in 1087, and was succeeded by his son.

Qabus nama 
Keikavus was not only a ruler, but also a poet; in 1082, he wrote the Qabus nama, which he named after his grandfather Qabus. The book was written in Persian, the native language of Keikavus. The book contains forty-four chapters.

In the book, Keikavus recalls his noble origins. He tells about the genealogy of his father, saying that he was a descendant of Arghush Farhadan, the king of Gilan, who lived during the time of Kai Khosrow.

Keikavus states in the book, that the grandmother of his father, was descended from Sasanian king Khosrau I. He also states that his mother was a Ghaznavid princess, and that his great-grandmother of his father's side was the daughter of Hasan ibn al-Fairuzan, a noble of Tabaristan and a relative of Makan ibn Kaki.

The first four chapters of the book tells about the creation of the world, and God's is religious duties. The fifth chapter is about duties towards parents. The next two deal with the cultivation of the mind and the power of speech. The next chapters talks about youth and old age; moderation in food; consumption of wine; chess and backgammon; love; the pleasures of life; having a hot bath; sleep and rest; hunting; polo; war; accumulation of wealth; trust in words; the purchase of slaves; the purchase of properties; the purchase of horses; marriage; children's education; the choice of friends; how to deal with enemies; forgiveness; punishment and favors; studies and legal functions; commercial law; medicine; astrology and mathematics; poetry; the art of minstrelsy; the service of kings; the qualities of a courtier, secretaries, viziers, generals and king; farming and agriculture; and finally about generosity.

In the book, Keikavus also says the following about his grandfather:

References

Sources

Further reading
 

Ziyarid dynasty
11th-century monarchs in Asia
11th-century Iranian people
11th-century Persian-language poets
1087 deaths